Hong, Sung Taek (born 13 March 1966) is a mountaineer, adventurer, explorer and author from South Korea.  He is currently a National Geographic Explorers supported by a National Geographic explorers program and also associated with Defytime and a principal of KSAF Mountaineers Academy. He is renowned for reaching all the Three Poles and crossing the Bering Strait and Greenland for the first time. He summited Everest in 1995, skied to the South Pole in 1994 and walked to the North Pole in 2005. He also crossed Bering Strait by foot in 2012 (official) and crossed Greenland by dog sledding in 2011. He was thus the first in the world to reach all the five poles (Everest, North and South Poles, Bering Straits, Greenland).

Expeditions

Publications

An essay book telling about the experiences in SP, NP, Everest, Bering and Greenland

A master's thesis, Korea University, 2001

Awards

2019 World Star Awards Sport/Excellence Award

2001 Korea Expedition Awards

1994 Korea National Sport Merit Medal

References

1966 births
Living people
South Korean mountain climbers
South Korean explorers
Explorers of Antarctica
Explorers of the Arctic
Non-fiction outdoors writers
South Korean summiters of Mount Everest
Korea University alumni
People from Gumi, North Gyeongsang